In music, Op. 143 stands for Opus number 143. Compositions that are assigned this number include:

 Karg-Elert – 
 Ries – Piano Trio in C minor
 Schubert – Piano Sonata in A minor, D 784
 Schumann – "Das Glück von Edenhall" (Uhland) for solo voice, chorus, and orchestra